Wornall Road is a major north–south road in Kansas City, Missouri. It is named for John Bristow Wornall, an early settler of Kansas City, whose estate still stands today as a museum.

Route description
Wornall Road begins at 42nd Street in the Old Westport neighborhood. This section dead-ends after one block, interrupted by the campus of St. Luke's Hospital. Wornall then picks back up on the other side, extending to 47th Street on the Plaza.

After a one-block interruption in the Plaza (where the road is named Broadway Street), Wornall Road begins in earnest after it crosses Brush Creek and Ward Parkway at the south end of the Plaza. Upon leaving the Plaza, Wornall Road climbs up a hill and passes by Loose Park. Between Ward Parkway and Gregory Boulevard (formerly 71st Street), Wornall is a largely residential street, passing through the up-market neighborhoods of Country Club District and Brookside. It is along this stretch (at the corner with 61st Terrace) that the Wornall House is located.

South of Gregory Boulevard, Wornall Road changes to more of a commercial, suburban arterial-type road (although remaining within Kansas City city limits). This stretch of commercial development (interspersed by apartments and middle-class suburban ranch houses) extends more-or-less uninterrupted to the junction with Interstate 435, just south of 103rd Street. It is along this section (centered on the corner with 75th Street) that the neighborhood of Waldo is located.

South of Interstate 435, Wornall Road once again assumes a mostly residential nature, passing numerous apartment complexes and suburban housing developments. Between I-435 and Red Bridge Road (the equivalent of 111th Street), Wornall deviates somewhat to the east; south of Red Bridge Road, Wornall Road drops to two lanes.

At around 119th Street, Wornall Road runs past the campus of Avila University. The street goes past houses, as well as a couple golf courses, along its southernmost stretch. Wornall Road has its southern terminus at the intersection with 135th Street in Martin City, not far from Highway 150 and the Kansas state line.

Overall, Wornall Road extends a distance of about  through Kansas City.

References

Streets in Kansas City, Missouri